Opposites: Live from Glasgow is the second full-length live album by Scottish alternative rock band Biffy Clyro, released on 29 November 2013 on 14th Floor Records. It was released exclusively in Germany, Austria, and Switzerland. It was recorded during their live performance at the Scottish Exhibition and Conference Centre, in Glasgow, Scotland on 1 April 2013, one of their concerts of the Opposites Tour.

The track list relies mostly on songs from their previous studio album Opposites, released in January 2013. Its artwork is also almost the same as that album, featuring a red sky instead of a blue one.

Track listing

References 

2013 live albums
Biffy Clyro albums